Bathurst Correctional Centre, originally built as Bathurst Gaol in 1888, is a prison for men and women located in the city of Bathurst, New South Wales, Australia, and operated by the Department of Communities and Justice. Bathurst holds inmates sentenced under State or Australian criminal law, along with a small number of remand prisoners.

The prison is made up of three sections: a medium-security and remand facility for male inmates, a minimum-security facility for male inmates, and a new maximum-security facility for male inmates, due to open in 2020. A small number of female inmates are housed within a separate compound on the grounds of the medium-security area.

History
Correction facilities were first established in the Bathurst town centre in circa 1830, as the Bathurst Gaol, adjacent to the Bathurst Court House, also designed by Barnet. As sanitary conditions at the town watch house deteriorated, a new gaol was built to Barnet's designs. The old gaol was demolished in 1889.

The gaol was proclaimed on 7 June 1888, and built at a cost of just over 102,000 pounds. The hand-carved sandstone gate at the new gaol featured an ornate sculptured lion's head holding a key that is a Victorian symbol designed to impress wrongdoers with the immense power and dignity of the law. Legend has it that when the key falls from the lion's mouth, the prisoner are allowed to go free. The new building which contained 308 cells and "commodious workshops" was complete and partly occupied in 1888. This was one of a number of gaols rebuilt or enlarged in this period, the purpose of which was to commence the program of 'restricted association' of prison inmates. The Governor of the Bathurst gaol reported on restricted association as follows:
"The restricted treatment for male prisoners has been in vogue for the past seventeen months, and has worked in every way satisfactorily. The prisoners are more obedient, and there is a marked improvement in the discipline; several of them have on many occasions told me that they would not desire to return to the old system. On the 11th December, the new treatment was introduced into the female division, under the supervision of the Comptroller-General for Prisons everything passed off satisfactorily, and ever since has worked well. A few days afterward the whole of the prisoners, by yards (when mustered for dinner) desired me to thank the Comptroller-General for his kindness in placing them under the treatment, stating that they were grateful for the concessions allowed to them in the way of reading and light at night."

Marble cutting and polishing provided works for the prisoners between 1893 and 1925. The gaol accommodated the tougher and more experienced prisoners until 1914 when the gaol then catered for the "previously convicted but hopeful cases". During WW1, rural industries such as dairy, pig-raising, market gardening, hay and fodder production were established. During WW2, the gaol was used as an internment camp for some 200 German and other "enemy aliens". In 1957–62, a new cell block was built outside the gaol's wall with accommodation for 94 prisoners. In 1974, riots at the gaol caused much damage to the main buildings.

The gaol generally accommodated prisoners where they "were deemed amenable to reformative influences" up until 1970 where the gaol was reclassified as a maximum security prison.

Riots

The Bathurst riots and Bathurst batterings were a series of violent disturbances and reprisals that occurred at the gaol in October 1970 and February 1974. The second outbreak of violence led to the partial destruction and temporary closure of the prison, and ultimately to a Royal Commission into the State's prison system.

Name change
Between 1992 and 1993, the name of Bathurst Gaol was changed to Bathurst Correctional Centre.

Description 

Bathurst Gaol is composed of a square compound with a gatehouse and two watch towers located at the far corners. The Governor and Deputy Governors Residences are located outside the main compound walls. Internally the (now demolished) chapel formed the focus of the gaol. Four cell ranges and the cookhouse radiated out from the chapel. On one side of the chapel forecourt was the totally separated female compound. On the other side was the male hospital.

Bathurst and Goulburn gaols were almost identical in plan. Goulburn however remains more intact.

Notable prisoners
Rodney Adler (2005–06)disgraced Australian businessman and former company director
Jim McNeil (James Thomas McNeil) (1935-1982), (1973–74) violent criminal who became better known as the 'prison playwright'
Michael Murdoch, convicted in the murder of Anita Cobby

Heritage listing 
Bathurst Gaol is significant as one of two model prisons designed by the Colonial Architect's Office in the late 1870s and early 1880s; as an indication of advances in penal architecture in the late nineteenth century; for its continued use as a gaol.

Bathurst Correctional Complex was listed on the New South Wales State Heritage Register on 2 April 1999.

Industries 
Inmates at the Centre may be employed in Corrective Service Industries (CSI) food services, the commercial laundry, technology/packaging and packaging business units. Inmates can also do general ground, horticulture, cleaning and building maintenance work on and outside the complex.

CSI also operates the Girrawaa Creative Centre, employing around 15 Indigenous inmates at a time. The program is aimed at developing inmates' artistic skills while creating Aboriginal artefacts for sale. Pieces such as boomerangs, paintings, coasters, clapsticks and didgeridoos are produced for sale to the public directly from the gallery, online, to government agencies, and to wholesalers.

Notable inmates
Bob Merritt (1945–2011), Aboriginal writer, who wrote the play The Cake Man in the prison

See also

Stir, 1980 film loosely based on the riots at the prison in 1974

References

Citations

Sources 

 Attribution

External links

 Bathurst Correctional Centre webpage - part of the Corrective Services NSW

Bathurst, New South Wales
Prisons in New South Wales
1888 establishments in Australia
James Barnet buildings
Infrastructure completed in 1888
New South Wales State Heritage Register